Allan Thomas (born 14 December 1990) is a Lebanese-South African football goalkeeper who is currently playing on Moroka Swallows in South Africa. The Ally Cat has been playing for the Swallows in the Premier Soccer League since the 2007–08 season.

Career

He played for Moroka Swallows.

References

External links

1990 births
Living people
People from Benoni
South African soccer players
South African Roman Catholics
Lebanese Maronites
South African people of Lebanese descent
Sportspeople of Lebanese descent
White South African people
Moroka Swallows F.C. players
Association football goalkeepers
Sportspeople from Gauteng